Valdemar Borovskij (also known as Valdemaras Borovskis; born 2 May 1984 in Vilnius) is a Lithuanian footballer who currently plays as a right-back for A lyga side Trakai.

Career
On 8 February 2015, Borovskij signed with Bulgarian club Beroe Stara Zagora following a successful trial period. On 22 February, he was sent off for a second yellow card in his official debut - a 0:1 away loss against champions Ludogorets Razgrad in the second leg of a Bulgarian Cup match.

Before the start of 2016 season Valdemar signed one year contract with I Lyga winners Lietava. He became one of his team leaders and helped team to qualify into the Championship round. Borovskij was elected into the A Lyga Team of the Week 8 times and was elected FK Lietava Player of the Year after season ended.

On 26 December 2016, he agreed to join A Lyga vice-champions Trakai.

International career
Borovskij's good form in the 2011 A Lyga season saw him named in the Lithuanian squad for a friendly against Poland. On 25 March 2011, he made his Lithuania debut in the 2–0 win over Poland, coming on for Edgaras Česnauskis as a substitute in the 82nd minute.

Career statistics

National team

References

External links

1984 births
Living people
Lithuanian footballers
Lithuania international footballers
FK Vėtra players
FC Šiauliai players
FK Sūduva Marijampolė players
FK Jonava players
FK Riteriai players
FK Daugava (2003) players
PFC Beroe Stara Zagora players
A Lyga players
Latvian Higher League players
First Professional Football League (Bulgaria) players
Lithuanian expatriate footballers
Expatriate footballers in Latvia
Lithuanian expatriate sportspeople in Latvia
Expatriate footballers in Bulgaria
Lithuanian expatriate sportspeople in Bulgaria
Lithuanian people of Russian descent
Association football fullbacks